Scarchilli is an Italian surname. Notable people with the surname include:

Alessio Scarchilli (born 1972), Italian footballer
Claudio Scarchilli (1924–1992), Italian actor
Sandro Scarchilli (1934–1999), Italian actor

Italian-language surnames